Križ is a dispersed settlement in the forested hills above the right bank of the Mirna River in the Municipality of Sevnica in central Slovenia. Traditionally, this area south of the Mirna Valley is part of Lower Carniola. It comprises the hamlets of Voznik and Kovačev Hrib at Voznik Hill and Kovač Hill to the west of it. Other hamlets are Artiče, Gradišče, Košele, Plavne, Reber, and Veliki Vrh. These stand on the hill ridges.

Kovač Hill Church
A church built by the people evicted by the Germans during World War II in gratitude for their return home stands in the hamlet of Kovačev Hrib. It is dedicated to the Mary Help of Christians and belongs to the Parish of Tržišče. It can accommodate 50 people.

The little church was originally built in 1953. After the authorities in the Socialist Republic of Slovenia wanted to demolish it, a local man went to Josip Broz Tito personally, who said to him: "If it is standing, then let it stand and don't demolish it." This was enough to preserve the building.

From 2011 to 2012, due to its poor condition, the church was rebuilt. The Russian artist Elena Sigmund, living in Budna Vas, made new stained glass for the church. On 7 October 2012, it was blessed by the Bishop of Novo Mesto, Andrej Glavan.

Gallery

References

External links

Križ at Geopedia

Populated places in the Municipality of Sevnica